Hernanz is a Spanish surname. Notable people with the surname include:

Javier Hernanz (born 1983), Spanish sprint canoeist
Javier Martí Hernanz (born 1992), Spanish tennis player
Samuel Hernanz (born 1986), French-born Spanish slalom canoeist

Spanish-language surnames